Le déserteur is a 2008 Quebec feature film directed by Simon Lavoie. The film stars Émile Proulx-Cloutier, Raymond Cloutier, Danielle Proulx, Viviane Audet, Benoît Gouin and Gilles Renaud.

It tells the story of Georges Guénette, a deserter from the Canadian Army during World War II, who was shot and killed by members of the Royal Canadian Mounted Police.

Background
Georges Guénette was a deserter from the Canadian Army and, like many French Canadians during World War II, an opponent of the war and conscription.

In May 1944, a few months after Guénette deserted from the army, four Royal Canadian Mounted Police (RCMP) officers found Guenette in his father's farmhouse, in St-Lambert-de-Lévis (near Quebec City). He jumped out of a window and ran across the fields. Guénette fell, wounded "by a ricocheting bullet," and died without the last rites of the church.

Two RCMP officers were later charged with manslaughter in Guénette's death, and the shooting was an issue in the 1944 Quebec general election.

References

2008 films
Canadian drama films
Films about deserters
Films directed by Simon Lavoie
French-language Canadian films
2000s Canadian films